Prince Baudouin of Belgium (3 June 1869 – 23 January 1891) was the first child and eldest son of Prince Philippe, Count of Flanders, and his wife, Princess Marie of Hohenzollern-Sigmaringen. After Baudouin's death, his younger brother eventually became heir presumptive after the death of their father, and later succeeded their uncle Leopold II as Albert I of Belgium.

Background
Baudouin was the nephew of Leopold II of Belgium. Leopold II's eldest (and only surviving) son, Leopold, Duke of Brabant, died six months before Baudouin's birth. This death left the king with only one person in the line of succession – Leopold's younger brother, Prince Philippe, Count of Flanders. Baudouin's birth in June 1869 was celebrated throughout the country. He was second in line to the throne at the time of his birth, after his father. Leopold was to have one more child, another daughter, Clémentine. Baudouin was thus groomed to eventually succeed his uncle as king.

Death

Baudouin died in the Palace of the Count of Flanders on 23 January 1891, a day after the anniversary of his cousin Leopold's death. Baudouin had been visiting his sick sister, Henriette. The prince, who had been suffering a bout of influenza, insisted on staying with his sister. Rumours circulated after his death that foul play had been involved, including a suggestion that Baudouin's death was a copy of the suicide of Crown Prince Rudolf of Austria; Rudolf was the husband of Baudouin's cousin, Stéphanie. Baudouin was, at the time of his death, soon to be betrothed to his cousin, Clémentine.

Upon the death, the Belgian Parliament was adjourned and theatres and public institutions were closed until after the funeral. Baudouin's body was interred at the royal vault at the Church of Our Lady of Laeken in Brussels. After Baudouin's death, his younger brother, Albert, eventually became heir presumptive after the death of their father, and later succeeded their uncle Leopold as Albert I of Belgium.

Honours 
 Grand Cordon in the Order of Leopold.

Ancestry

References

Bibliography

 Bilteryst Damien, Le prince Baudouin, frère du Roi-Chevalier, Bruxelles, Editions Racine, 2013, 336 p. 

Nobility from Brussels
1869 births
Princes of Saxe-Coburg and Gotha
House of Saxe-Coburg and Gotha (Belgium)
1891 deaths
Burials at the Church of Our Lady of Laeken
Deaths from the 1889–1890 flu pandemic